Walter Ireland (25 April 1882 – 2 November 1932) was an Irish tennis player. He competed in the men's singles and doubles events at the 1924 Summer Olympics.

References

External links
 

1882 births
1932 deaths
Irish male tennis players
Olympic tennis players of Ireland
Tennis players at the 1924 Summer Olympics
People from Rathmines